AEBI is a Switzerland-based manufacturer of municipal equipment. The company's products include transporters, Implement carriers, road sweepers, tractors, and mowers to be used in municipal maintenance of roads   .

History 
 1883: In Burgdorf, Switzerland, Johann Ulrich Aebi established a workshop for manufacturing turbines and sprayers
 1894: Workshop held on development of an industrial enterprise with production
 1895: Aebi builds starts the production of a replica of McCormick's reaper
 1910: Production of threshing equipment, feed elevators, and forceps begins
 1915: Experimental use of a 4-wheel Mähtraktors
 1928: Launch of a modernization campaign in workshop and machinery
 1929: Production of 3-wheel Mähtraktors
 1931: Approximately 40,000-"Helvetia" mowers were sold
 1932: Production of the world's first ball-reaper begins
 1942: Takeover of the company Stadler AG; total workforce: 270; turnover: 5.8 million Swiss francs
 1950: Launch of the first motor mower: the Aebi AM 50
 1954: Production of the first-Aebi Einachstraktors with Triebachsanhänger
 1964: The first Aebi transporter is presented
 1971: Production of snowblowers begins for municipal and winter use
 1976: Development of the Terratrac DD 77, a hangtauglichem Zweiachsmäher
 1981: Founding of the Aebi vehicles and machinery in Kematen GmbH (Austria)
 1986: Presentation of the TT 88 with hydrostatic drive
 1995: Founding of Aebi France S.à.r.l. in Genas, France
 1998: Founding of North America Inc. Aebi in Richmond, Virginia, USA; Nussmüller acquisition of land and municipal engineering Schwanberg GmbH (Austria)
 1999: Takeover of the company MFH AG, Maschinenfabrik in Hochdorf, Switzerland
 2006: The Aebi Holding AG is represented by a group led by entrepreneur Peter Spuhler

External links 

 Aebi Schmidt Holding
 Aebi Group
 History of AEBI trucks - All models
Stadler AG  Train Manufacturer

Manufacturing companies established in 1883
Swiss brands
Machinery